Milorad Nikolić (Serbian Cyrillic: Милорад Николић; 23 July 1920 – 12 September 2006) was a Serbian football player.

Born in Belgrade, Kingdom of Yugoslavia, he is remembered as one of the most talented young players that played in the Yugoslav First League before World War II. Playing as a left-winger, he was extremely appreciated for his speed and strong shot.

He started playing with SK Sloga Belgrade and in 1935 he moved to BSK Belgrade where he played initially with the youth squad. It was in the season 1938-39 when his club won the national championship, that he made his first occasional appearances in the senior squad. In the next season he was already a usual starter, playing along many other Yugoslav legends such as Mrkušić, Stoiljković, Dubac, Manola, Dragićević, Lechner, Glišović, Valjarević, Božović and Vujadinović, all of them were also his colleagues at the Yugoslav national team. Nikolić played a total of three matches for Yugoslavia, two in 1940 and one in 1941, in the last match of the royal Yugoslav team. Because of the war, his career was interrupted and in June 1944 he emigrated to Switzerland where he played for Lausanne-Sports. He got married there and would later emigrate to the United States, where he remained for the rest of his life.

External sources

References

1920 births
2006 deaths
Footballers from Belgrade
Serbian footballers
Yugoslav footballers
Yugoslavia international footballers
OFK Beograd players
FC Lausanne-Sport players
Yugoslav First League players
Serbian expatriate footballers
Expatriate footballers in Switzerland
Association football midfielders